The Grupo de Operaciones Policiales Especiales (GOPE) is the police tactical unit of Carabineros de Chile which carries out high-risk police operations throughout the country, including bomb disposal, location and tracking of bombs and explosives, rescuing people or bodies from places of difficult access, anti-crime raids, and clashes. GOPE is a special force of military uniformed police, as stipulated in the Constitutional Act of Carabineros.

History

GOPE was created on 7 June 1979 with the aim of acting as a complementary force to police troops across the country, and respond to the various situations that occurred in the country during that time period.

Its trajectory demonstrates the professionalism of its crew, made up of highly trained policemen to counter the most dangerous criminal activities. Its tasks are supported by the Special Action Patrols (PAES), which perform tasks of shelter and protection of citizens.

Jurisdiction 

The Special Police Operations Group has jurisdiction over the entire Chilean national territory, including the Insular Area and the Chilean Antarctic Territory. This is to ensure national security and not only state or regional.

Vehicles 
GOPE vehicles are mostly used for transporting equipment for the work of the EOD section.

Fields of operation 
Their operations can be classified into four different groups:

Counter - terrorism 

 Hostage release
 Entre and search

Counter - bombing 

 Deactivation of explosives
 Counter bomb search
 Post detonation investigation

Human rescue 

 Saturated or contaminated environments
 Rescue and salvage in aquatic environments
 Rescue and salvage in highlands

Protection of Person of Interest 

 Direct security
 Altitude security (rooftop shooter)
 Reaction security
 Search of hotels and installations
 Search of vehicles

See also
 Investigations Police of Chile 
 Chilean Army
 Chilean Navy

References

External links
 Carabineros official page

Law enforcement in Chile
Organizations established in 1979
Police tactical units
Articles containing video clips